The 1900–01 Princeton Tigers men's ice hockey season was the 2nd season of play for the program.

Season
Princeton played a large number of games for a team at the time, competing against fellow colleges as well as professional clubs and secondary schools.

Roster

Standings

Schedule and Results

|-
!colspan=12 style=";" | Regular Season

References

Princeton Tigers men's ice hockey seasons
Princeton
Princeton
Princeton
Princeton